KWNW (101.9 FM) - branded as "101.9 Kiss FM - is a radio station broadcasting a Top 40 (CHR) format serving the Memphis, Tennessee, area.  The station is currently owned by iHeartMedia and is licensed to Crawfordsville, Arkansas.  The station's studios are located in Southeast Memphis, and the transmitter site is in West Memphis, Arkansas.

History
The station was previously licensed in Jonesboro, Arkansas, and was a longtime adult contemporary station since KBTM. On April 28, 1988, after playing "'65 Love Affair" by Paul Davis, the station flipped from adult contemporary to Top 40 as "Superhits 102". A year later in 1989, the branding was changed to "Power 102".

The frequency was previously located in the Jonesboro market (where it had the call letters KIYS). The station relocated to Crawfordsville where it began to target the Memphis area on September 10, 2010.  While located in Jonesboro, the station was Top 40 (CHR) as "Kiss FM", owned by Clear Channel Communications (now iHeartMedia) but operated by East Arkansas Broadcasters under a local marketing agreement (LMA). After the 101.9 frequency moved to Crawfordsville, East Arkansas Broadcasting acquired KRLW-FM, which had been at 106.3, moved the frequency over to 101.7 and relaunched the station as "101.7 Kiss FM". The new station signed on September 12, 2010 (after the 101.9 frequency signed off with a 2-day loop redirecting listeners to 101.7) and began serving the Jonesboro market. Clear Channel Communications then affixed the "Radio Now" moniker to 101.9.

The station's competition as CHR is primarily WHBQ-FM HD-2 B96.3 and Hot AC WMC-FM, and slightly favors Rhythmic hits to target teens and young adults. 

On March 7, 2014, at 5pm, KWNW rebranded back to "101.9 Kiss FM", restoring the Kiss FM brand to the frequency for the first time since its days in Jonesboro. Radio Now signed off with "It's So Hard to Say Goodbye to Yesterday" by Boyz II Men, while the first song as the revived Kiss FM was "Kiss Kiss" by Chris Brown.

On April 29, 2020 KWNW added Elvis Duran and the Morning Show to their lineup.

History of call letters
The call letters KWNW were previously assigned to an AM station in Wenatchee, Washington. A Don Lee Network affiliate, it began broadcasting June 15, 1948 on 1340 kHz with 250 W power. That station was owned by Apple-Land Broadcasters, Incorporated.

References

External links
Official Website

WNW
Contemporary hit radio stations in the United States
Radio stations established in 1979
1979 establishments in Arkansas
IHeartMedia radio stations